The Formulary of Marculf is the longest and best preserved formulary (collection of model documents) from the Merovingian kingdoms. Written in Latin, it contains 92 models divided between two books, the first dealing with royal and the second with private charters. It was compiled in the second half of the seventh century by a monk named Marculf, then over seventy years of age, for a bishop named Landeric. Owing to its fine organization, possession of a preface and good manuscript transmission, it has often been treated as a literary work, quite unlike other formularies.

Notes

Bibliography

7th-century Latin books